The 2019 European Shooting Championships were held in Bologna and Tolmezzo, Italy from 12 to 23 September 2019.

Pistol and rifle competitions were held in Bologna from 11 September to 23 September, and 300 m rifle competitions were held in Tolmezzo from 22 to 27 September. Previously in Lonato del Garda from 3 to 17 September the 2019 European Shotgun Championships had taken place with regard to shotgun competitions (trap, skeet and double trap).

Medal table

Men's events

Pistol

Rifle

300 m rifle

Women's events

Pistol

Rifle

300 m rifle

Mixed events

Pistol

Rifle

300 m Rifle

Men's Junior events

Pistol

Rifle

Women's Junior events

Pistol

Rifle

Mixed Junior events

Pistol

Rifle

See also
 2019 European Shotgun Championships
 2019 European Running Target Championships
 European Shooting Confederation

References

External links
 European Shooting Confederation official web site
 Results Book

European Shooting Championships
European Shooting Championships
2019 European Shooting Championships
European Shooting Championships
Shooting competitions in Italy
European Shooting Championships